The commissioner of the Northwest Territories is the Government of Canada's representative in the Northwest Territories. Similar in certain functions to a lieutenant governor, the commissioner swears in the members of the legislative assembly, swears in members of the executive council, assents to bills, opens sessions of the legislative assembly, and signs other government documents such as Orders in Council.

Earlier commissioners were mostly deputy ministers in various ministries (Minister of the Interior, Mines, Mines and Resources).

As commissioners are appointed by the Government of Canada, they are not a vice-regal representative in the territory—that is, unlike in Canada's provinces, there is no such thing as a "territorial Crown" analogous to the provincial Crowns. The commissioner represents the federal government and must follow any instructions of the Cabinet or the relevant federal minister, currently the Minister of Crown-Indigenous Relations and Northern Affairs.

Since 1980, the territories have had self-government, with the legislature choosing a government leader or premier, in addition to electing members of parliament to the Parliament of Canada.

Commissioners of the NWT

Deputy commissioners

On 24 October 2011 Gerald W. Kisoun was appointed deputy commissioner and his term was originally for three years. It was extended for a second three years and is due to expire 10 December 2017.

See also
 Lieutenant-Governors of Northwest Territories (1869-1905)

References

External links
Office of the Commissioner of the Northwest Territories (NWT)
Official Handbook for Commissioners of the Territories (Canada)

Northwest Territories Commissioners